India competed at the 1956 Summer Olympics in Melbourne, Australia. 59 competitors, 58 men and 1 woman, took part in 32 events in 8 sports.

Medalists

Athletics

Men's High Jump
Ajit Singh
 Qualification Round — 1.96m (14)

Men's 200 metres
Milkha Singh
 Heat — 22.47 (→ did not advance)

Men's 800 metres
Sohan Singh
 Heat — 1.52.4(→ did not advance)

Women's 100 metres
Mary Rao
 Heat — DNF(→ did not advance)

Football

 First round

Quarterfinals

Semifinals

Bronze Medal match

Gymnastics
  waryam singh represent India with Gold medal

Hockey

Squad
Leslie ClaudiusRanganathan FrancisHaripal KaushikAmir KumarRaghbir LalShankar LakshmanO. P. Malhotra  Govind PerumalAmit Singh BakshiRaghbir Singh BholaBalbir Singh DosanjhHardyal Singh GarcheyRandhir Singh GentleBalkishan Singh GrewalGurdev Singh KullarUdham Singh KullarBakshish SinghCharles Stephen

Group standings

Semi-finals

Gold medal match

Shooting

Two shooters represented India in 1956.

50 m rifle, three positions
 Harihar Banerjee
 Haricharan Shaw

Swimming

Men's 100 m Freestyle
 Sri Chand Bajaj
 Heat — 1:01.6

Men's 200 metre butterfly
 Shamsher Khan
 Heat — 3:06.3

Weightlifting

Wrestling

Men's freestyle

References

Nations at the 1956 Summer Olympics
1956